Operation München was the Romanian codename of a joint German-Romanian offensive during the German invasion of the Soviet Union in World War II, with the primary objective of recapturing Bessarabia, Northern Bukovina and the Hertsa region, ceded by Romania to the Soviet Union a year before (Soviet occupation of Bessarabia and Northern Bukovina). The operation concluded successfully after 24 days of fighting. Axis formations involved included the Romanian Third  and the Fourth Armies and the German Eleventh Army. The invasion was followed by a genocide against the Jewish population of Bessarabia.

The offensive started on 2 July, with Romanian forces striking north. On 5 July, Chernivtsi, the capital of Northern Bukovina, was seized by the 3rd and 23rd Vânători de Munte Battalions. On 16 July, Chișinău, the Bessarabian capital, was seized after heavy fighting by Romanian forces spearheaded by the 1st Romanian Armored Division (Divizia 1 Blindată), equipped mainly with 126 R-2 light tanks. By 26 July, the entire region was under Romanian-German control. On 17 August, Bessarabia and Northern Bukovina were formally re-integrated into the Romanian state.

Fighting in Southern Bessarabia
The combat operations in Southern Bessarabia were some of the most complex in the entire operation, involving artillery, warships, aviation, soldiers and marines from both sides. The Soviet Danube Flotilla consisted of 5 river monitors, 22 armed and armored motor boats and 7 minesweeping boats. The Romanian Danube Flotilla had 7 river monitors, but fewer, about 4, small armed small boats. Fighting in this sector of the front started days before the operation, with a first skirmish between Soviet and Romanian warships on 23 June, when the Soviet vessels attempted to break the Romanian naval blockade. During the night of 9/10 July, the Soviet warships took advantage of the reduced visibility and managed to sneak out of the blockade. On 26 June, in support of the sea-borne Raid on Constanța, Soviet armored motor gunboats landed troops at Chilia Veche and captured most of the Romanian 15th Marine Infantry Battalion, Romanian losses amounting to 468 troops. The remnants of the battalion, supported by one armed boat and two motorboats, managed to defend Stipoc Island against further Soviet attacks. The Romanian 17th Marine Infantry Battalion managed to hold the Periprava sector all throughout the Operation and the preceding days, repelling numerous Soviet attacks. During this time, its artillery also sank four Soviet armored boats. On the night of 22–23 July, the battalion occupied Tatarbunary. Ultimately, the losses of the Soviet Danube Flotilla amounted to two river monitors damaged, five armored motor boats sunk and one more damaged. On 18–19 July, the Flotilla withdrew from the Danube Delta. Thus, on 22 July, the Romanians occupied Reni, Izmail, Kiliya and Vylkove.

Naval engagements
The Romanian naval formation involved in the operation, the Tulcea Tactical Group, fought several naval engagements against the Soviet Navy. These battles resulted in the damaging of two Soviet monitors and two armored motor gunboats, as well as the sinking of another armored motor gunboat. The two damaged Soviet gunboats were the result of an action preceding the operation by several days.

Action of 13 July
On 13 July, the Romanian monitor Mihail Kogălniceanu encountered a Soviet monitor near the village of Copana Balca. The Romanian monitor attacked, scoring a direct hit against her Soviet counterpart. The Soviet warship returned fire with no result before retreating.

Action of 14 July 
On 14 July, Mihail Kogălniceanu attacked the Soviet monitor Udarnyy at Ismail. Like on the previous day, the Romanian monitor scored a direct hit against her Soviet foe, despite the latter's fierce return fire. Udarnyy continued firing while retreating, but yet again, no damage was inflicted upon the Romanian warship.

Action off Isaccea
At some point during the Operation, Romanian armed barges shelled and sank an armored motor gunboat off Isaccea.

Air combat
The first Soviet-Romanian aerial combat was carried out by Sub-Lieutenant Teodor Moscu of Escadrila 51. While flying over Southern Bessarabia, his Heinkel He 112 was attacked by a formation of five Polikarpov I-16. The Romanian pilot swiftly shot down three of them, causing the other two to retreat. Eight more Soviet aircraft were shot down during this battle and 40 more were strafed on the ground, but the Romanians lost 11 of their own aircraft to Soviet ground fire. On 12 July, responding to a powerful Red Army counteroffensive, the Romanians assembled an air fleet of 59 bombers (mostly of Italian and Polish construction) escorted by 54 fighters (including Romanian-made IAR-80s). This mixed force swept the Soviets from the sky before decimating Soviet ground forces (artillery, troops, transports and tanks). In one instance, IAR-80 pilot Vasile Claru ran out of ammunition after destroying three of the six Polikarpovs pursuing him. Consequently, he rammed his plane into a fourth, killing a deputy Soviet squadron commander (M. Shamanov), but Claru himself didn't survive the crash either. Ultimately, the Soviet counteroffensive was repulsed with heavy losses. By 26 July, the Romanians had established air supremacy over Bessarabia and Northern Bukovina. They flew a total of 5,100 missions, claiming 88 enemy aircraft shot down in aerial combat plus 108 destroyed on the ground for the cost of 58 of their own aircraft. An additional 59 Soviet aircraft were shot down by Romanian flak.

See also
Romanian Navy during World War II
Action of 9 July 1941
Naval operations in Romanian-occupied Soviet waters

References

Bibliography
 

Battles involving Romania
Operation Barbarossa
Battles and operations of the Soviet–German War
Military operations of World War II involving Germany
Battles involving the Soviet Union
1941 in Romania
1941 in the Moldavian Soviet Socialist Republic
1941 in Ukraine
1941 in the Soviet Union
Naval battles and operations of the European theatre of World War II
Naval battles of World War II involving Romania
Naval battles of World War II involving the Soviet Union
July 1941 events
German–Romania military relations